Hotel Sessions may refer to:

 Hotel Sessions (Lydia EP)
 Hotel Sessions (Olivia Newton-John EP)